Matthew Hughes  (born August 3, 1989) is a Canadian middle- and long-distance runner. He is the current Canadian record holder for men in the steeplechase, a record which he set at the 2013 World Championships in Athletics.

Hughes is a Nike sponsored training group based out of Portland, Oregon coached by Jerry Schumacher.

Hughes competed in the NCAA for the University of Louisville where he was a two-time NCAA champion in the 3000 m steeplechase. He has a degree in sport sciences from that university.

In July 2016, he was named to Canada's Olympic team. He placed tenth in the 3000 m steeplechase at the 2016 Olympics. Hughes placed 14th in the 3000 m steeplechase at the 2019 World Athletics Championships.  Competing at his second Olympics at the 2020 Summer Olympics in Tokyo, Hughes placed sixth in the steeplechase, the highest-ever placement for a Canadian in the event.

References

External links
 
 

1989 births
Living people
Sportspeople from Oshawa
Canadian male long-distance runners
Canadian male steeplechase runners
Commonwealth Games competitors for Canada
Athletes (track and field) at the 2014 Commonwealth Games
Pan American Games gold medalists for Canada
Pan American Games medalists in athletics (track and field)
Athletes (track and field) at the 2015 Pan American Games
World Athletics Championships athletes for Canada
Louisville Cardinals men's track and field athletes
Athletes (track and field) at the 2016 Summer Olympics
Olympic track and field athletes of Canada
Athletes (track and field) at the 2018 Commonwealth Games
Canadian Track and Field Championships winners
Medalists at the 2015 Pan American Games
Athletes (track and field) at the 2020 Summer Olympics
21st-century Canadian people